Ternar may refer to:

 Tomislav Ternar, a Slovenian tennis player
 in mathematics, a triple system

See also
 Ternary (disambiguation)